Christopher Martins Pereira (born 19 February 1997) is a Luxembourgish professional footballer who plays as a defensive midfielder or central midfielder for Russian Premier League club Spartak Moscow and the Luxembourg national team.

Club career
Martins is a youth exponent from Racing FC in Luxembourg City. He transferred to the Lyon Academy in 2013.

Martins made his Lyon debut on 10 September 2017 in a Ligue 1 match against Guingamp. He started the match and was replaced by Jordan Ferri after 51 minutes in a 2–1 home win.

In June 2019 he signed for Swiss club Young Boys. He won both the 2019-20 and 2020-21 Swiss Super Leagues with the club.

On 31 January 2022, he joined Russian giants Spartak Moscow on a short-term loan. In their announcement of the transfer, Young Boys said that Spartak was expected to buy him out at the conclusion of the loan. Martins won the Russian Cup on 29 May 2022, with him starting in the 2-1  final victory against Dynamo Moscow in what is known as the Oldest Russian derby. On 3 June 2022, Spartak confirmed Martins' permanent transfer, and his signing until 2026.

International career
Martins represented Luxembourg at youth international levels, playing for them in the under-17, under-19, and under-21 age groups. Martins was eligible to represent France as he holds a French passport.

He was eligible to represent both Luxembourg and Cape Verde at international level; he rejected a call-up from Luxembourg's senior team in March 2013 as he had not decided which nation he wished to represent. After being called up again by Luxembourg, he made his debut on 8 September 2014, at the age of 17.

Career statistics

Club

International

Scores and results list Luxembourg's goal tally first, score column indicates score after each Martins goal.

Honours 
Young Boys
 Swiss Super League: 2019–20
 Swiss Cup: 2019–20

Spartak Moscow
Russian Cup: 2021–22

References

1997 births
Sportspeople from Luxembourg City
Luxembourgian people of Cape Verdean descent
Living people
Association football midfielders
Luxembourgian footballers
Luxembourg youth international footballers
Luxembourg under-21 international footballers
Luxembourg international footballers
Racing FC Union Luxembourg players
Olympique Lyonnais players
Football Bourg-en-Bresse Péronnas 01 players
ES Troyes AC players
BSC Young Boys players
FC Spartak Moscow players
Luxembourg National Division players
Championnat National 2 players
Ligue 1 players
Ligue 2 players
Swiss Super League players
Swiss 1. Liga (football) players
Russian Premier League players
Luxembourgian expatriate footballers
Luxembourgian expatriate sportspeople in France
Expatriate footballers in France
Luxembourgian expatriate sportspeople in Switzerland
Expatriate footballers in Switzerland
Luxembourgian expatriate sportspeople in Russia
Expatriate footballers in Russia